Helena Havelková (born 25 July 1988) is a Czech beach volleyball player. She was a member of the Women's National Team. She competed at the 2014–15 CEV Women's Champions League in Szczecin, Poland, claiming the silver medal.

Clubs
  VK TU Liberec (2003–2004)
  Slavia Prague (2004–2007)
  Sassuolo Volley (2007–2009)
  Yamamay Busto Arsizio (2009–2012)
  Dinamo Krasnodar (2012–2013)
  Eczacıbaşı VitrA (2013–2014)
  Yamamay Busto Arsizio (2014–2015)
  KPS Chemik Police (2015–2016)
  Shanghai (2016–2017)
  Unione Sportiva ProVictoria Pallavolo Monza (2017–2018)
  Dynamo Moscow (2018–2020)
 Bartoccini Fortinfissi Perugia (2020–2022)

Awards

Individuals
 2011 European Volleyball League "Best Scorer"
 2012 European Volleyball League "Best Receiver"
 2014–15 CEV Women's Champions League "Best Outside Spiker"

Clubs
 2009–10 Women's CEV Cup -  Gold medal, with Yamamay Busto Arsizio
 2011–12 Women's CEV Cup -  Gold medal, with Yamamay Busto Arsizio
 2014–15 CEV Women's Champions League -  Silver medal, with Yamamay Busto Arsizio

External links
 Helena Havelková at the International Volleyball Federation
 

1988 births
Living people
Czech women's volleyball players
People from Frýdlant
Expatriate volleyball players in Turkey
Place of birth missing (living people)
Expatriate volleyball players in Russia
Outside hitters
Expatriate volleyball players in Italy
Expatriate volleyball players in Poland
Expatriate volleyball players in China
Czech expatriate sportspeople in Turkey
Czech expatriate sportspeople in Russia
Czech expatriate sportspeople in Italy
Czech expatriate sportspeople in Poland
Czech expatriate sportspeople in China
Sportspeople from the Liberec Region